Play It Strange is a 2010 album by the Fresh & Onlys. Pitchfork placed it at number 29 on its list "The Top 50 Albums of 2010" and the track "Waterfall" at number 57 on its list "The Top 100 Tracks of 2010".

Track listing

References

2010 albums
The Fresh & Onlys albums
In the Red Records albums